Isabel Getty (born November 11, 1993) is an American singer, visual artist and socialite. She is the lead singer of the London-based rock band Jean Marlow.

Early life and family 
Isabel Getty is the daughter of Christopher Getty and Pia Miller. She is a member of the Getty family and the paternal great-granddaughter of J. Paul Getty, the founder of Getty Oil. Her maternal grandfather, Robert Warren Miller, is the co-founder of DFS Group. She is a maternal niece of Alexandra von Fürstenberg and Marie-Chantal, Crown Princess of Greece. She grew up on the Upper East Side in New York City and in London.

Education 
Getty attended The Harrodian School and Institut Le Rosey. After high school she enrolled at Tisch School of the Arts's Clive Davis Institute of Recorded Music at New York University, graduating in 2016.

Career 
In April 2016, Getty appeared alongside two of her first cousins, Princess Maria-Olympia of Greece and Denmark and Princess Talita von Fürstenberg, in a Vanity Fair feature paying tribute to their mothers.

After graduating from New York University in 2016, Getty moved to London where she worked on Spin, an EP that was later released by her rock band, Jean Marlow. In 2017, Jean Marlow toured across Europe and the United States for the first time.

Getty debuted her paintings at Faramacy in London in the summer of 2017. She has also designed the album artwork for her band. She works as an assistant to British contemporary artist Marc Quinn.

She has modeled in editorials and walked the runway for Dolce & Gabbana. She was featured in Dolce & Gabbana's #DGCAPRI sunglass campaign and walked in their 2017 Fashion Week show. In August 2017, she was featured on the cover of Vogue Japan.

References 

Living people
1993 births
21st-century American women artists
American female models
American women pop singers
American women rock singers
American women singer-songwriters
American socialites
Isabel
Miller family
People educated at The Harrodian School
Tisch School of the Arts alumni
21st-century American women singers
21st-century American singers
Alumni of Institut Le Rosey